Yang Hao (fl. ?–1629) was a scholar-official of the Ming dynasty of China. After the Ming lost several battles to Nurhaci, Yang Hao was executed by Zhu Youjian before the Ming collapsed to the Qing dynasty.

Having started his political career as a county magistrate, Yang was appointed inspector-general to the Ming troops sent to support the Joseon Dynasty during its struggle to fend off the second Japanese invasion of Korea from 1596 to 1598.  Due to his attempt to disguise the Chinese defeat in the Siege of Ulsan as a victory, Yang was recalled from the commanding post and received no more significant commissions until appointed grand coordinator of Liaodong in 1610. 

In the Battle of Sarhu (1618–1619) against the rebelling Jurchens led by Nurhaci, the Ming armies under Yang's command suffered a catastrophic defeat. Yang was held responsible and imprisoned until he was finally executed in 1629. However the Ming dynasty would eventually be destroyed as the Qing dynasty reunified China.

References 

Ming dynasty scholars
People executed by the Ming dynasty
1629 deaths
Ming dynasty generals
Ming dynasty politicians
Politicians from Shangqiu
Year of birth unknown
Generals from Henan
People of the Japanese invasions of Korea (1592–1598)